is a Japanese professional baseball pitcher for the Nettuno Baseball Club of the Italian Baseball League (IBL). He previously played in Nippon Professional Baseball (NPB) for the Tohoku Rakuten Golden Eagles and Yokohama DeNA BayStars.

Career

Tohoku Rakuten Golden Eagles
The Tohoku Rakuten Golden Eagles selected Hamaya with the third overall selection in the 2013 Nippon Professional Baseball draft. Hamaya spent the majority of the 2014 season with the farm team, posting a 2.83 ERA in 12 games. On September 28, 2014, Hamaya made his NPB debut.

In 2015, Hamaya made 8 appearances for Rakuten, posting a 7.20 ERA with 14 strikeouts in 10.0 innings pitched. The following season, Hamaya struggled to a 10.24 ERA in 13 appearances with the main club. In 2017, Hamaya played in 7 games with the Eagles, pitching to a 5.19 ERA with 8 strikeouts in 8.2 innings. Hamaya spent the majority of the 2018 season with the farm team, and logged a 3.72 ERA with 8 strikeouts in 9.2 innings of work across 7 appearances with the main team.

Yokohama DeNA BayStars
On March 26, 2019, Hamaya was traded to the Yokohama DeNA BayStars in exchange for Kento Kumabara. Hamaya spent the majority of the year with Yokohama's farm team, and struggled to a 32.40 ERA in 2 games with the main club. In 2020, Hamaya pitched in 18 games for the BayStars, recording a 3.60 ERA with 18 strikeouts in 25.0 innings of work. On December 2, 2020, he became a free agent.

Ibaraki Astro Planets
On February 8, 2021, Hamaya signed with the Ibaraki Astro Planets of the Baseball Challenge League.

El Águila de Veracruz
On July 19, 2021, Hamaya’s contract was purchased by El Águila de Veracruz of the Mexican League. He was released on January 19, 2022.

Nettuno Baseball Club
On March 17, 2022, Hamaya announced that he had signed with the Nettuno Baseball Club of the Italian Baseball League for the 2022 season.

References

External links

NPB stats

1993 births
Living people
Baseball people from Nara Prefecture
Japanese baseball players
Nippon Professional Baseball pitchers
Tohoku Rakuten Golden Eagles players
Venados de Mazatlán players
Japanese expatriate baseball players in Mexico
Yokohama DeNA BayStars players
El Águila de Veracruz players